The Bollingen Prize for Poetry is a literary honor bestowed on an American poet. Every two years, the award recognizes a poet for best new volume of work or lifetime achievement. It is awarded without nominations or submissions by the Beinecke Rare Book and Manuscript Library of Yale University.

Inception and controversy

The prize was established in 1948 by Paul Mellon, funded by a US $10,000 grant from the Bollingen Foundation to the Library of Congress. Both the prize and the foundation are named after the village of Bollingen, Switzerland and the Bollingen Tower, where Swiss psychiatrist Carl Jung had a country retreat. The inaugural prize, chosen by a jury of Fellows in American Letters of the Library of Congress, was awarded to Ezra Pound for his collection of poems The Pisan Cantos.

The choice of a work by a man who had been a committed fascist sympathizer and who was then under indictment for treason in World War II for his anti-Semitic broadcasts infuriated many. A bitter controversy ensued in the press, and a congressional committee requested the Library of Congress disassociate itself from the award. The unused portion of the grant was returned to the Bollingen Foundation in 1949.

Continuance through the Yale University Library
The Bollingen Foundation decided to continue the program with the administrative tasks being handled by the Yale University Library. The prize was awarded annually from 1948 to 1963. In 1963, the amount of the award was increased to $5,000. After 1963, it was given every other year. The Bollingen Foundation was dissolved in 1968, and the Andrew W. Mellon Foundation took over funding. In 1973, the Mellon Foundation established an endowment of $100,000 to enable the Yale Library to continue awarding the prize in perpetuity.

In 1961, a similar prize was set up by the Bollingen Foundation for best translation and it was won by Robert Fitzgerald for his translation of the Odyssey.  It has also been won by Walter W. Arndt for his translation of Eugene Onegin, and in 1963 by Richard Wilbur and Mona Van Duyn jointly.

Recipients

 1965 – Horace Gregory
 1967 – Robert Penn Warren
 1969 – John Berryman and Karl Shapiro
 1971 – Richard Wilbur and Mona Van Duyn
 1973 – James Merrill
 1975 – A. R. Ammons
 1977 – David Ignatow
 1979 – W. S. Merwin
 1981 – Howard Nemerov and May Swenson
 1983 – Anthony Hecht and John Hollander
 1985 – John Ashbery and Fred Chappell
 1987 – Stanley Kunitz
 1989 – Edgar Bowers
 1991 – Laura Riding Jackson and Donald Justice
 1993 – Mark Strand
 1995 – Kenneth Koch
 1997 – Gary Snyder
 1999 – Robert Creeley
 2001 – Louise Glück
 2003 – Adrienne Rich
 2005 – Jay Wright
 2007 – Frank Bidart
 2009 – Allen Grossman
 2011 – Susan Howe
 2013 – Charles Wright
 2015 – Nathaniel Mackey
 2017 – Jean Valentine
 2019 – Charles Bernstein
 2021 – Mei-mei Berssenbrugge

When awarded annually

 1949 – Ezra Pound
 1950 – Wallace Stevens
 1951 – John Crowe Ransom
 1952 – Marianne Moore
 1953 – Archibald MacLeish and William Carlos Williams
 1954 – W. H. Auden
 1955 – Léonie Adams and Louise Bogan
 1956 – Conrad Aiken
 1957 – Allen Tate
 1958 – E. E. Cummings
 1959 – Theodore Roethke
 1960 – Delmore Schwartz and David Jones
 1961 – Yvor Winters
 1962 – John Hall Wheelock and Richard Eberhart
 1963 – Robert Frost

See also
American poetry
Bollingen Foundation
Bollingen Tower
Carl Jung

Lists
List of American literary awards
List of literary awards
List of poetry awards
List of years in literature
List of years in poetry

References

American poetry awards
Awards established in 1948
Yale University Library
Awards and prizes of Yale University